The 1975 Harvard Crimson football team was an American football team that represented Harvard University during the 1975 NCAA Division I football season. A year after sharing the Ivy League crown, the Crimson won the championship outright in 1975.

In their fifth year under head coach Joe Restic, the Crimson compiled a 7–2 record and outscored opponents 216 to 133. Daniel M. Jiggetts was the team captain.

Harvard's 6–1 conference record placed first in the Ivy League standings, for the second year in a row. The Crimson outscored Ivy opponents 189 to 113. 

Harvard played its home games at Harvard Stadium in the Allston neighborhood of Boston, Massachusetts.

Schedule

References

Harvard
Harvard Crimson football seasons
Ivy League football champion seasons
Harvard Crimson football
Harvard Crimson football